Wybrzeże Gdańsk Handball SA, competing for sponsorship reasons as Torus Wybrzeże Gdańsk, is a professional men's handball club based in Gdańsk in northern Poland, founded in 1951, and competing in the Polish Superliga. Ten–time Polish Champion, two–time EHF Champions League silver medallist (1986, 1987). One of the most titled handball clubs in Poland.

Honours

Domestic
 Polish Superliga
Winners (10): 1965–66, 1983–84, 1984–85, 1985–86, 1986–87, 1987–88, 1990–91, 1991–92, 1999–2000, 2000–01

International
 EHF Champions League
Silver (2): 1985–86, 1986–87

Team

Current squad
Squad for the 2022–23 season

Goalkeepers
1  Miłosz Wałach
 16  Adam Witkowski
 41  Kornel Poźniak
Left wingers
 21  Piotr Papaj
 77  Maciej Papina
Right wingers
 19  Mateusz Kosmala
 34  Bartosz Andrzejewski
Line players
 24  Veljko Davidović
 32  Nejc Žmavc
 88  Damian Woźniak

Left backs
7  Patryk Pieczonka
9  Rafał Stępień
Centre backs
4  Jakub Powarzyński
 15  Mateusz Jachlewski
 42  Jakub Będzikowski
Right backs
 13  Jovan Milićević
 30  Wiktor Tomczak

Transfers
Transfers for the 2023–24 season

 Joining

 Leaving

References

External links
 Official website 

Polish handball clubs
Sport in Gdańsk
Handball clubs established in 1951
1951 establishments in Poland